Events from the year 1700 in Denmark.

Incumbents
 Monarch – Frederick IV
 Grand Chancellor – Conrad von Reventlow

Events

 18 February – Instigated by Ole Rømer, Denmark adopts the Gregorian calendar, although not its lunar portion, in place of the Julian calendar.
 February – The Great Northern War breaks out and will last until 1721. Russia has joined a Danish-Polish coalition the previous year against Sweden which forms an alliance with Frederick IV, Duke of Holstein-Gottorp.
 5 April  The  coronation of Frederick IV and Queen Louise at Frederiksborg Castle.
 4 August – The Landing at Humlebæk: The Swedish King Charles XII lands with an army at Humlebæk north of Copenhagen.
 12 March  The Swedish troops marches from Humlebæk towards Copenhagen to siege the city.
 17 August – The Peace of Travendal is concluded when Denmark signs a peace treaty at Traventhal House in Holstein. Denmark has to withdraw from Holstein and Sweden withdraws from Denmark. The peace will last for the next 10 years.

Undated
 Benoît Le Coffre becomes Painter to the Danish Court.
 The first Danish census takes place from 1700 to 17001 but only  statistical information about adult men is included. Only about half of it still exists.

Births
3 May - Frederik Adeler, government official and landowner (d. 1766)

Deaths
 May 23 – Jens Juel, diplomat, statesman (b, 1631)

Full date unknown
 Hans van Steenwinckel the Youngest, architect (b. 1639)

References

 
Denmark
Years of the 18th century in Denmark